Pelguranna (Estonian for "Refuge Beach") is a subdistrict in the district of Põhja-Tallinn (North Tallinn) in Tallinn, the capital of Estonia. It is located between Pelgulinn, Kopli and Sitsi and is bordered with the Stroomi Beach by the Kopli Bay (part of Tallinn Bay) to the west, and the Merimets forest park to the south. Houses there mostly consist of 4-9 floor apartment buildings. Pelguranna has a population of 15,142.

The construction of first residential buildings started in the end of the 1940s. The area was previously known as Sitsi karjamaa ("Sitsi pasture") but was primarily a wasteland with some kitchen gardens. With its small quarters, Pelguranna was one of the first complexly built neighborhoods in Tallinn (by architects K. Luts and August Volberg). Besides the apartment buildings, there were built schools, kindergartens, shops, a polyclinic and a cinema. That area makes up the northern half of the nowadays Pelguranna. The southern part was built from 1960s to the 1980s and consists of pre-fabricated panel houses.

The main recreational area is the Stroomi Beach (also known as Pelgurand), which is also one of two most popular beaches in Tallinn (the other being Pirita Beach in Pirita).

Gallery

References

Subdistricts of Tallinn